NGC 656 is a barred lenticular galaxy located in the Pisces constellation about 175 million light-years from the Milky Way. It was discovered by the Prussian astronomer Heinrich d'Arrest in 1865.

See also 
 List of NGC objects (1–1000)
Heinrich d'Arrest

References

External links 
 

Barred lenticular galaxies
0656
Pisces (constellation)
006293